Michael Chaplin may refer to:

 Michael Chaplin (actor) (born 1946), English-American actor
 Michael Chaplin (writer) (born 1951), English television writer and executive
 Mike Chaplin (born 1943), British artist